State Route 114 (SR-114) is a state highway in the US state of Utah that spans  in Utah County. The route forms a loop around  US-89 and roughly parallels the coast of Utah Lake as it passes through the west side of Provo, Lindon and Orem, eventually terminating in Pleasant Grove. The highway consists of a portion of Center Street and all of Geneva Road. The highway was formed in 1931, the southern terminus initially extending into the east side of Provo. In 1965, the route was truncated to its present state.

Route description
The route begins at the intersection of 500 West (US-89) and Center Street in Provo, with SR-114 heading west on the latter, a four-lane highway. The route reaches an interchange at I-15, where it narrows down to one lane in each direction. The highway continues west on Center Street before reaching Geneva Road—a two-lane highway—where the route turns north onto. Geneva Road turns northwest before intersecting with 820 North. Now the first road east of Utah Lake, the road curves in a more north-northwesterly direction while entering Orem. The road also begins to parallel I-15 at this point, also intersecting University Parkway (SR-265) where it becomes a five lane highway. Past 800 South, SR-114 turns north and intersects Orem's Center Street. Turning north-northwest again, the highway crosses 800 North (SR-52) and passes under I-15 before turning north one final time, and entering Pleasant Grove. The road terminates at State Street (US-89).

The entire route has been listed as part of the National Highway System.

History
State Route 114 was established in 1931, forming the current loop around US-89—which at that time was cosigned with US-91—and serving the east shore of Utah Lake in the Provo area. In 1963, the route was extended east to end at the State Mental Hospital. This change was reverted in 1965, but the portion of Center Street between Seven Peaks Boulevard and the state mental hospital was restored in 1969 as SR-294.

Major intersections

References

114
 114
Provo, Utah
Orem, Utah
Streets in Utah